The Hellenic National Defence General Staff (abbr. ΓΕΕΘΑ) is the senior staff of the Hellenic Armed Forces. It was established in 1950, when the separate armed services ministries were consolidated into the Ministry of National Defence. Its role in peacetime was as a coordinating and senior consultative body at the disposal of the Greek government, and in wartime as the overall headquarters of the Armed Forces. In recent years, through ongoing efforts at increased inter-services cooperation and integration, the HNDGS has assumed peacetime operational control over the separate branches. Between 19 December 1968 and 10 August 1977, the HNDGS was abolished, and the Armed Forces Headquarters (abbr. ) established in its place.

The Chief of the HNDGS 
The Chief of the Hellenic National Defence General Staff conducts the HNDGS and is the main adviser to the Government Council for Foreign Affairs and Defence (KYSEA) and to the Minister of Defence on military issues. Through the Chiefs of General Staffs, he carries out the operational commanding of the Joint Headquarters and the units that come under them, as well as the rest forces, when it comes to the issues of operation plans implementation and the Crises management System implementation, conduction of operations outside the national territory and participation of the Armed Forces in the confrontation of special situations during peace time.

He constructs the National Military Strategy after taking into consideration the suggestions of the General Staffs of the Armed Forces Services and according to the directions of the Ministry of Defence he manages and proposes the priority of the armament programs and suggests the general policy directions and priorities on every operational objective.

Traditionally, since  1970, the Chief of the HNDGS holds the rank of full general, admiral or air chief marshal, and is the only serving four-star officer of the Hellenic Armed Forces (as opposed to retired, since three-star ranks are often promoted one rank on retirement). 

Since 17 January 2020, the incumbent Chief of the Hellenic National Defence General Staff, is General Konstantinos Floros.

List of chiefs of the HNDGS

Notes

References

External links 
 Hellenic Ministry of Defence – Official Site 
 Hellenic National Defence General Staff – Official Site
 Former Chiefs of Defence – Hellenic National Defence General Staff – Official Site

Military of Greece
Greece
1950 establishments in Greece